Mi Mundo may refer to:

 Mi Mundo (Marta Sánchez album), 1995
 Mi Mundo (Luis Enrique album), 1989